In baseball statistics, a putout (denoted by PO or fly out when appropriate) is given to a defensive player who records an out by tagging a runner with the ball when he is not touching a base, catching a batted or thrown ball and tagging a base to put out a batter or runner (a force out), catching a thrown ball and tagging a base to record an out on an appeal play, catching a third strike (a strikeout), catching a batted ball on the fly (a fly out), or being positioned closest to a runner called out for interference. The center fielder (CF) is one of the three outfielders, the defensive positions in baseball farthest from the batter. Center field is the area of the outfield directly in front of a person standing at home plate and facing beyond the pitcher's mound. The outfielders' duty is to try to catch long fly balls before they hit the ground or to quickly catch or retrieve and return to the infield any other balls entering the outfield. Generally having the most territory to cover, the center fielder is usually the fastest of the three outfielders, although this can also depend on the relative strength of their throwing arms and the configuration of their home field, due to the deepest part of center field being the farthest point from the infield and home plate. The center fielder normally plays behind the shortstop and second baseman, who play in or near the infield; unlike catchers and most infielders (excepting first basemen), who are virtually exclusively right-handed, center fielders can be either right- or left-handed. In the scoring system used to record defensive plays, the center fielder is assigned the number 8.

The overwhelming majority of putouts recorded by center fielders, almost to exclusivity, result from catching fly balls. However, in extraordinary circumstances, an outfielder may record a putout by receiving a throw to force out or tag out a runner while covering a base if one or more infielders are out of position to retrieve an errant throw, or by tagging a runner stranded between bases in a rundown play; however, even in such circumstances, outfielders will more typically act as a backup to infielders than cover a base themselves. Historically, putout totals for outfielders rose after 1920 with the end of the dead-ball era; the same circumstances which had kept home run totals low, such as overused baseballs and legal adulterations including the spitball, had similarly hindered the type of power hitting which lent itself to long fly balls. But as strikeout totals have risen in baseball in recent decades, the frequency of other defensive outs including flyouts has declined; as a result, putout totals for outfielders have likewise declined. Through the 2022 season, 27 of the top 30 single-season center field putout totals were recorded between 1924 and 1986; only five of the top 112 have been recorded since 2003.

Because game accounts and box scores often did not distinguish between the outfield positions, there has been some difficulty in determining precise defensive statistics before 1901; because of this, and because of the similarity in their roles, defensive statistics for the three positions are frequently combined. Although efforts to distinguish between the three positions regarding games played during this period and reconstruct the separate totals have been largely successful, separate putout totals are unavailable; players whose totals are missing the figures for pre-1901 games are notated in the table below. Because they are expected to cover more territory in the outfield than their counterparts on either side, often being the fastest player of the three, center fielders typically record the highest putout totals; six of the top seven career leaders in outfield putouts, and 14 of the top 18, were center fielders. Willie Mays is the all-time leader in putouts as a center fielder with 7,024; he is the only player to record more than 7,000 career putouts as a center fielder.

Key

List

Stats updated through the 2022 season

Other Hall of Famers

Notes

References

External links

Major League Baseball statistics
Putouts as a center fielder